Barrow Street is a hamlet in Wiltshire, England, about  southeast of the town of Mere.  The name comes from the early Bronze Age bowl barrow at Barrow Farm.

Barrow Farmhouse is from the 17th century.

References

External links

Hamlets in Wiltshire
Mere, Wiltshire